Cerreto d'Esi is a comune (municipality) in the Province of Ancona in the Italian region Marche, located about  southwest of Ancona.

Cerreto d'Esi borders the following municipalities: Fabriano, Matelica, Poggio San Vicino.

References

Cities and towns in the Marche